The New Zealand Women's Curling Championship is the national championship of women's curling in New Zealand. It has been held annually since 2005 and organized by New Zealand Curling Association. From 1994 to 2004 the national champions were the winners of the Wendorf Rock, and the event was open to both genders. Some winning teams had men's and women's players.

List of champions and medallists
The past champions and medalists of the event are listed as follows (in order – fourth/skip, third, second, lead, alternate):

The Wendorf Rock (champions only)
Host arena: Dunedin Curling Club.

New Zealand Curling Championship — Women

Medal record for curlers
(2005–2022)

Notes

References

External links
NZ Championship : Women | New Zealand Curling

See also
New Zealand Men's Curling Championship
New Zealand Mixed Doubles Curling Championship
New Zealand Mixed Curling Championship

Curling competitions in New Zealand
Recurring sporting events established in 2005
2005 establishments in New Zealand
Recurring sporting events established in 1994
1994 establishments in New Zealand
National curling championships
Women's sports competitions in New Zealand